Albert Wirsching (31 January 1920 – 21 August 1997) was a German footballer. He played club football with Eintracht Frankfurt, Kickers Offenbach, FC Bern, TSV 1860 Munich, BSC Young Boys and FC Winterthur.

Career 
Wirsching was part of the Eintracht Frankfurt squad that played from 1936 to 1941 in der Gauliga Südwest and later from 1941 to 1945 in the Gauliga Hessen-Nassau, one of the first tier Gauligas in Nazi Germany. In the 1938 campaign he won with Eintracht Frankfurt the Gauliga Südwest, admitting the Eagles to the German football championship group stage. He appeared in all six group matches scoring 7 goals which meant a runners-up position next to Hamburger SV. In the 1935 founded cup competition Tschammerpokal he competed from 1937 in four seasons, amounting seven games and two goals. His debut came on 29 August 1937 in a first round loss to SpVgg Sülz 07 in the Tschammerpokal.

After the end of World War II he played for Eintracht from 1945 until 1948 in the Oberliga Süd, back then the first German tier.

He moved to rivals Kickers Offenbach for the 1948–49, winning Oberliga Süd in his first season. In the next season he and his team finished as third. For Kickers Offenbach he competed in 1948–49 and in 1949–50 four final round matches for the German championship. The third place play-off on 9 July 1949 at Stadion Oberwerth in Koblenz was lost 2–1 after extra time to 1. FC Kaiserslautern, just like the final match in the next season against VfB Stuttgart that was lost with the same result on 25 June 1950 at Olympiastadion in Berlin.

After this loss he went to Switzerland, playing two seasons for FC Bern, firstly in the second tier Nationalliga B and after an immediate promotion in the Nationalliga A securing the league stay as twelfth out of 14 teams.

After Wirsching's return to Germany he signed in the 1952–53 season for TSV 1860 Munich that eventually finished as second to last and were relegated to the 2. Oberliga Süd. Once again he went to Switzerland and played there for three clubs.

Firstly he played in the 1953–54 campaign for Nationalliga A club BSC Young Boys, from 1954 to 1956 for Nationalliga B club FC Winterthur where he contributed to FCW's promotion to Nationalliga A. Albert Wirsching's last club before retirement was FC Langenthal.

Honours 

 Gauliga Südwest/Mainhessen
 Champions: 1938
 Runners-up: 1937
 Oberliga Süd
 Champions: 1949
 German football championship
 Runners-up: 1950

References

Sources

External links
 Albert Wirsching at eintracht-archiv.de

1920 births
1997 deaths
German footballers
Footballers from Frankfurt
Eintracht Frankfurt players
Kickers Offenbach players
FC Bern players
TSV 1860 Munich players
BSC Young Boys players
FC Winterthur players
Association football forwards
Expatriate footballers in Switzerland
Expatriate football managers in Switzerland
German expatriate footballers
German expatriate sportspeople in Switzerland
FC Winterthur managers